"Para Volver a Amar" (English: In Order to Love Again) is a Latin pop song written and performed by Kany García. The song was chosen as the third single from Kany's second album, Boleto De Entrada. The song was released to radio on May 18, 2010.

Background
The song "Para Volver a Amar" was chosen to be the theme song for the new campaign for the Office of Women of Puerto Rico against domestic violence. This new campaign is to alert young women about the physical and emotional abuse.

The song was also chosen to be the theme song for the Mexican telenovela, titled "Para Volver A Amar".
The song was also chosen in Puerto Rico to be the theme song for the first 60 episodes of the Colombian telenovela Doña Bella.

Track listing
US Promo CDR
 "Para Volver a Amar" (Radio Edit) – 3:35
 "Para Volver a Amar" (Main Version) – 3:47
 "Para Volver a Amar" (Digital Version) – 3:40

Music video
The music video for "Para Volver a Amar" was filmed in Puerto Rico and was directed by William “Pipo” Torres. The video is part of an educational campaign of the attorney of women in Puerto Rico. With the video and song, Garcia seeks to bring a crucial message for these times: that violence against women is unacceptable. The music video was filmed on May 25, 2010
The concept of the music video is very simple, shot on a set with a white background. It shows Kany in two different outfits, playing the guitar in some parts of the video. Throughout the song, lyrics are being display in the background. The music video is followed with a commercial with Kany talking about domestic abuse.

Awards/Nominations

Chart performance
"Para Volver a Amar" was released to radios on May 18, 2010 and made its debut on the charts the following week. On Billboard Latin Pop charts, it debuted at #39, with the following week jumping 12 spaces to land at #27. It stayed at the same position for 2 weeks, on where later it landed at #22.  In Puerto Rico, the song has peaked within the top 20.

Charts

References

2010 singles
Kany García songs
Songs written by Kany García
2008 songs
Sony BMG singles